Iguania is an infraorder of squamate reptiles that includes iguanas, chameleons, agamids, and New World lizards like anoles and phrynosomatids. Using morphological features as a guide to evolutionary relationships, the Iguania are believed to form the sister group to the remainder of the Squamata, which comprise nearly 11,000 named species, roughly 2000 of which are iguanians. However, molecular information has placed Iguania well within the Squamata as sister taxa to the Anguimorpha and closely related to snakes. The order has been under debate and revisions after being classified by Charles Lewis Camp in 1923 due to difficulties finding adequate synapomorphic morphological characteristics. Most Iguanias are arboreal but there are several terrestrial groups. They usually have primitive fleshy, non-prehensile tongues, although the tongue is highly modified in chameleons. The group has a fossil record that extends back to the Early Jurassic (the oldest known member is Bharatagama, which lived about 190 million years ago in what is now India). Today they are scattered occurring in Madagascar, the Fiji and Friendly Islands and Western Hemisphere.

Classification 
The Iguania currently include these extant families:

Clade Acrodonta
Family Agamidae – agamid lizards, Old World arboreal lizards
Family Chamaeleonidae – chameleons
Clade Pleurodonta – American arboreal lizards, chuckwallas, iguanas
 Family Leiocephalidae
Genus Leiocephalus: curly-tailed lizards
 Family Corytophanidae – helmet lizards
 Family Crotaphytidae – collared lizards, leopard lizards
 Family Hoplocercidae – dwarf and spinytail iguanas
 Family Iguanidae – marine, Fijian, Galapagos land, spinytail, rock, desert, green, and chuckwalla iguanas
 Family Tropiduridae – tropidurine lizards
subclade of Tropiduridae Tropidurini – neotropical ground lizards
 Family Dactyloidae – anoles
 Family Polychrotidae
subclade of Polychrotidae Polychrus
 Family Phrynosomatidae – North American spiny lizards
 Family Liolaemidae – South American swifts
 Family Opluridae – Malagasy iguanas
 Family Leiosauridae – leiosaurs
subclade of Leiosaurini Leiosaurae
subclade of Leiosaurini Anisolepae

Phylogeny 
Below is a cladogram from the phylogenetic analysis of Daza et al. (2012) (a morphological analysis), showing the interrelationships of extinct and living iguanians:

Conservation Status 
As of 2020 The IUCN Red List of endangered species lists 63.3% of the species as Least concern, 6.7% Near Threatened, 8.2 vulnerable, 9.1% endangered, 3.1% critically endangered, 0.3 extinct and 9.2% data deficient. The major threats include agriculture, residential and commercial development.

References

Further reading 
 
 

 
Early Jurassic first appearances